St Joseph's Church is a parish church located in Pont-Aven in Brittany, France. There is an organized exposition of religious paintings and reproductions of paintings in the nearby Tremalo Chapel. As the church is adjacent to rue Émile Bernard, some of Émile Bernard's paintings are showcased there.

History 
Dating: third quarter of the 19th century
Years: 1874, 1875
The church was built according to plans by architect Joseph Bigot, between 1874 and 1875, by contractor Louis Berger and by Jean-Louis Le Naour for the bell tower.  The narrowness of the land acquired by the municipality for construction guided the building plan leading to the creation of a false transept.

Description
Main structure and implementation: granite, stone, plaster, rubble, concrete
Roof: slate
Plan: Latin cross
Nave and floor: three sections
Type and nature of the cover: cover paneling
External elevation: elevation span
Type of roofing: roof with long expanses; polygonal steeple in masonry
Descriptive comment: Latin cross with three aisles. Sacristy to the north at the fifth bay. South porch in alignment with the third bay. Western gate in arch inscribed in a front building topped by an open bell tower chamber, cushioned by a hexagonal steeple. Structural work in the rubble coated with the exception of the western elevation and window bays and quoins, stone. Two lateral chapels, one to the north, one to the south, at the seventh bay, forming a false transept. The nave has seven bays covered with paneling painted blue tie-in. Arched vaults directly into the chamfered square pillars. Floor covered with slabs of granite.

References 

Couffon, René, Le Bars, Alfred. Diocèse de Quimper et de Léon. Nouveau répertoire des églises et chapelles. Quimper : Association Diocésaine, 1988, p. 320 Rannou, Nolwenn. L'exercice de l'architecture et de la restauration en France au XIXe siècle: la carrière de Joseph
Bigot (1807–1894), architecte finistérien, volume III/IV : catalogue. Thèse. Université Rennes 2 - Haute-Bretagne, UFR Arts-Lettres-Communication, 2007, p. 115.
 The Catholic Directory
Inventaire général du patrimoine culturel

External links

19th-century Roman Catholic church buildings in France
Churches in Finistère
Roman Catholic churches in France